This is a list of current and former courthouses of the United States federal court system located in Arkansas. Each courthouse entry of the United States federal court system indicates the name of the building, placed in a table alongside its depiction (a photo, if available), its location, and the jurisdiction it serves. The dates during which a courthouse was used within a jurisdiction and, if applicable, the person for whom it was named, as well as the date of any renaming constitute the remaining tabular column entries. Dates of use will not necessarily correspond with the dates of construction or demolition of a building, as pre-existing structures have been on occasion adapted for court use, and former court buildings have been relegated to other uses. Also, the official name of the building may have changed at some point after its use as a federal court building.

Courthouses

Key

References

External links

Eastern District of Arkansas (main page)
Western District of Arkansas (general information)
U.S. Marshals Service Eastern District of Arkansas Courthouse Locations
U.S. Marshals Service Western District of Arkansas Courthouse Locations

Arkansas
Federal courthouses
Courthouses, federal